Stacia Joseph (born 7 November 1985) is an Australian field hockey coach and former player, who represented the national team.

Career
Joseph made 42 appearances for the national team. She made her international debut in June 2009 against Argentina in the 2009 Women's Hockey Spar Cup, and was later included in the Australian squad for the 2009 Women's Hockey Champions Trophy.

At club level, she played for Southern Storm in 2008. She was later captain of the Victorian Vipers from 2011 to 2015. During that time, the Vipers won the 2012 Australian Hockey League. In 2014, she was named the Victorian Premier League's most valuable player.

In 2016, she became the Victorian Institute of Sport's head hockey coach. During the 2018 Commonwealth Games, she was one of eight female coaches who worked in the Australian Institute of Sport's development program.

Personal life
Joseph has worked as a physical education teacher. She had a child in 2018.

References

1985 births
Living people
Australian female field hockey players
Place of birth missing (living people)
21st-century Australian women
Field hockey players from Melbourne
Australian field hockey coaches